NGC 285 is a lenticular galaxy in the constellation Cetus. It was discovered on October 2, 1886 by Francis Leavenworth.

References

External links
 

0285
18861002
Cetus (constellation)
Lenticular galaxies
Discoveries by Francis Leavenworth
003141